Zofia Zamenhof (December 13, 1889 – September 12, 1942) was a Polish pediatrician and the daughter of Klara (Silbernik) and L. L. Zamenhof, the inventor of Esperanto.

From 1907 to 1913 she completed her medical studies at the University of Lausanne and she passed a state examination in Saint Petersburg in 1914. She then continued to specialize in internal and pediatric diseases. She worked at a hospital in Lebedin, and from 1922 in a hospital in Warsaw. During World War II, she moved to the Warsaw Ghetto. Despite the presence of the Nazis, she continued her medical practice until she was arrested and transported to a death camp. In 1942 she was taken from the Umschlagplatz in Warsaw's ghetto to the extermination camp in Treblinka, where she was murdered, most likely in a gas chamber.

Her symbolic tomb (commemorative plaque near the tomb of Klara Zamenhof) is located on the Jewish Cemetery, Warsaw.

References 

1889 births
1942 deaths
Esperanto speaking Jews
Polish people who died in Treblinka extermination camp
Warsaw Ghetto inmates